Luther High School is a parochial school located in Onalaska, Wisconsin. It is associated with the Wisconsin Evangelical Lutheran Synod. The majority of the students come from a group of churches in the area with the same religious affiliation. Some students come from as far away as Tomah, Wisconsin or Lewiston, Minnesota.

The school's athletic teams participate in the Coulee Conference in the Wisconsin Interscholastic Athletic Association (WIAA).

History
Luther High School opened on September 8, 1957. The original class consisted of 29 ninth graders. The school was opened as a subsidiary of the Wisconsin Evangelical Lutheran Synod, with the original feeder congregations being the four churches in the La Crosse area: First Lutheran, Mt. Calvary, Grace, and Immanuel. Of these four, only First Lutheran and Immanuel had elementary school programs from which to draw students. The following years brought steady increases to enrollment (46 in 1958 and 72 in 1959) that allowed for expansion of the school and an addition to the school structure. Since then, the school has had several additions to accommodate growing enrollment and technical advancements.

Luther High School hosted a 50th anniversary celebration in 2007. Current faculty, past faculty, and past students presented at the day-long celebration. A book containing a photographic history of the previous 25 years was produced for the event.

Extracurricular activities
The football team made playoffs for the first time as a WIAA school in 2007 and finished the year with 7 wins and 3 losses.

The girls' basketball team won the Coulee title in 2008 by going undefeated in the conference and won the regionals, beating Aquinas.

Notable alumni
Dan Kapanke, Wisconsin Senate

See also
La Crosse Central High School
La Crosse Logan High School
Onalaska High School
Holmen High School
West Salem High School
Aquinas High School

Notes

External links 

 

Private high schools in Wisconsin
Schools in La Crosse County, Wisconsin
Educational institutions established in 1957
Secondary schools affiliated with the Wisconsin Evangelical Lutheran Synod
1957 establishments in Wisconsin